Toussaint Dubreuil ( – 22 November 1602) was a French painter associated (from 1594) with the second School of Fontainebleau (together with the artists Martin Fréminet and Ambroise Dubois) and Italianism, a transitional art style.

Dubreuil was born in Paris.  His works in the late Mannerist style, many of which have been lost, continue in the use of highly elongated and undulating forms and crowded compositions reminiscent of the work of Francesco Primaticcio (–1570).  Many of Dubreuil's subjects include mythological scenes and scenes from works of fiction by such writers as the Italian Torquato Tasso, the ancient Greek novelist Heliodorus of Emesa and French poet Pierre de Ronsard.

See also

French art
French Renaissance

References

1560s births
1602 deaths
16th-century French painters
French male painters
French tapestry artists
Painters from Paris
French Mannerist painters